The 1973 Rhode Island Rams football team was an American football team that represented the University of Rhode Island as a member of the Yankee Conference during the 1973 NCAA Division II football season. In its fourth season under head coach Jack Gregory, the team compiled an overall record of 6–2–2 with a mark of 4–1–1 against conference opponents, placeed second out of seven teams in the Yankee Conference, and outscored opponents by a total of 213 to 177. The team played its home games at Meade Stadium in Kingston, Rhode Island.

Schedule

References

Rhode Island
Rhode Island Rams football seasons
Rhode Island Rams football